Omorgus baccatus is a species of hide beetle in the subfamily Omorginae and subgenus Afromorgus.

References

baccatus
Beetles described in 1867